Vanessa is a genus of brush-footed butterflies in the tribe Nymphalini. It has a near-global distribution and includes conspicuous species such as the red admirals (e.g., red admiral, Indian red admiral, New Zealand red admiral), the Kamehameha, and the painted ladies of the Cynthia group (formerly a subgenus): Painted lady, American painted lady, West Coast lady, Australian painted lady, etc. For African admirals, see genus Antanartia. Recently, several members traditionally considered to be in the genus Antanartia have been determined to belong within the genus Vanessa.

The name of the genus may have been taken from the character Vanessa in Jonathan Swift's poem "Cadenus and Vanessa," which is the source of the woman's name Vanessa. In the poem Vanessa is called a "nymph" eleven times, and the genus is closely related to the previously-named genus Nymphalis. Though the name has been suggested to be a variant of "Phanessa", from the name of an Ancient Greek deity, this is unlikely. The name of the deity is actually not "Phanessa" but Phanes. Johan Christian Fabricius, the entomologist who named this genus, normally used the original forms of the names of classical divinities when he created new scientific names.

North American species in the genus overwinter as adults.

Species
The 22 extant species are:
Vanessa abyssinica (C. & R. Felder, 1867) – Abyssinian admiral
Vanessa altissima (Rosenberg & Talbot, 1914) – Andean painted lady
Vanessa annabella (Field, 1971) – West Coast lady
Vanessa atalanta (Linnaeus, 1758) – red admiral
Vanessa braziliensis (Moore, 1883) – Brazilian painted lady
Vanessa buana (Fruhstorfer, 1898) – Lompobatang lady 
Vanessa cardui (Linnaeus, 1758) – painted lady or cosmopolitan
Vanessa carye (Hübner, [1812]) – western painted lady
Vanessa dejeanii Godart, 1824
Vanessa dilecta Hanafusa, 1992
Vanessa dimorphica (Howarth, 1966) – dimorphic admiral or northern short-tailed admiral 
Vanessa gonerilla (Fabricius, 1775) – New Zealand red admiral
Vanessa hippomene (Hübner, 1823) – southern short-tailed admiral
Vanessa indica (Herbst, 1794) – Indian red admiral or Asian admiral
Vanessa itea (Fabricius, 1775) – Australian or yellow admiral
Vanessa kershawi (McCoy, 1868) – Australian painted lady
Vanessa myrinna (Doubleday, 1849) – vivid banded lady or banded lady
Vanessa samani (Hagen, 1895)
Vanessa tameamea (Eschscholtz, 1821) – Kamehameha butterfly
Vanessa terpsichore Philipi, 1859 – Chilean lady
Vanessa virginiensis (Drury, [1773]) – American lady or American painted lady
Vanessa vulcania (Godart, 1819) – Canary red admiral

Fossil species
A fossil species, V. amerindica, is known from a specimen found in the Chadronian-aged Florissant Lagerstatte, from Late Eocene Colorado, and coexisted with several other extinct butterfly taxa.

References

External links

 Iastate.edu: More information about the genus Vanessa

 
Extant Eocene first appearances
Nymphalini
Butterfly genera
Taxa named by Johan Christian Fabricius